The accuracy of these dates for bird extinctions varies wildly between one entry and another.

15th century 
c. 1400
 Haast's eagle

16th century 
c. 1500
 Moa (Emeus huttoni)
 Moa (Pachyornis septentrionalis)

17th century 
1650
 Broad-billed Parrot
1680
 Mauritian Red Rail
1681
 Dodo
1690
 Réunion Sheldgoose
 Mascarene Teal

18th century 
c. 1700
 Elephant Bird
 Leguat's Rail
 Mauritian Barn Owl (Tyco sauzieri)
 Réunion Solitaire
1722
 Labat's Conure
1750
 Guadeloupe Amazon
 Martinique Amazon
1760
 Lesser Antillean Macaw
1765
 Jamaican Yellow-headed Macaw
1770
 White Dodo
1776
 Réunion Fody
1777
 Society Parakeet
1780
 Bay Thrush
 Mysterious Starling
 Rodriguez Solitaire
1793
 Oceanic Eclectus Parrot

19th century 
c. 1800
 Amsterdam Island Duck
 Dominican Green-and-yellow Macaw
 Painted Vulture
 Reunion Ring-necked Parakeet
 Rodrigues Parrot
 Moorea Sandpiper
 Tahiti Sandpiper
 Tanna Ground Dove
 Tonga Tabu Tahiti Flycatcher (subsp.)
1801
 Norfolk Pigeon
1825
 Oahu ‘Ōma’o (subsp.), a thrush
1826
 Pigeon Hollandaise
1827
 Kusaie Mountain Starling
1828
 Kittlitz's Thrush
1830
 Bonin Grosbeak
 Kangaroo Island Emu (subsp.)
 White Gallinule
1837
 Oahu O-O, 
1840
 Dieffenbach's Rail
 Mascarene Parrot
1842
 Jamaican Green and Yellow Macaw
1844
 Great Auk
c. 1850
 Black-fronted parakeet
 Commerson's Scops Owl
 Kioea, a honeyeater
 Kittlitz's Rail
 Giant Moa (Dinornis maximus)
 Moa (Megalapteryx didinus)
 Rodriguez Little Owl
 Steller's Spectacled Cormorant
 Tasmanian Emu (subsp.)
1851
 Norfolk Kaka, a parrot
1853
 Lord Howe Island Pigeon
1859
 Jamaican Pauraque, a nightjar
1860
 New Caledonean Lorikeet
1864
 Cuban Red Macaw
1868
 New Zealand Quail
 Réunion Crested Starling
1869
 Red-fronted Parakeet
1870
 Himalayan Mountain Quail
1873
 Samoan Wood Rail
1874
 Coues's Gadwall, a duck
1875
 Labrador Duck
1879
 Bonin Night Heron
1880
 Macquarie Island Banded Rail
 Rodrigues Ring-necked Parakeet
1881
 Jamaican Wood Rail
 Seychelles Parakeet
1884
 Sandwich Rail
1887
 Ryukyu Kingfisher
1890
 Comoro Scops Owl
 Macquarie Island Parakeet
 Oahu Nukupu'u (subsp.), 
 Tristan Gallinule, a moorhen
1891
 Lesser Koa-finch
1892
 Guadalupe (Berwick's) Wren (subsp.)
 Puerto Rican Conure, a parrot
 ʻUla-ʻAi-hawane,
1894
 Kona Grosbeak
 Lana'i 'Akioloa (subsp. lanaiensis),
 Lyall's Wren
1895
 Chatham Island Fernbird
1896
 Greater Koa-finch
 Maui Nui 'Akialoa (subsp. affinis), 
1898
 Hawaii Mamo, 
1899
 Culebra Island Amazon, a parrot

20th century 
c. 1900
 Bonin Wood Pigeon
 Antiguan Burrowing Owl (subsp.)
 Guadeloupe Burrowing Owl (subsp.)
 Guadalupe Rufous-sided Towhee (subsp. consobrinus), a bunting
 North Island Laughing Owl (subsp. albifacies)
 South Island Laughing Owl (subsp. rubifacies)
 Modest Rail
 North Island Bush Wren (subsp.)
 Queleli, a falcon
 Saint Kitts Puerto Rican Bullfinch (subsp.)
 Tahiti Rail
 Martinique Wren (subsp.)
1901
 Greater Amakihi, 
1904
 Molokai ‘ō‘ō, 
1906
 Chatham Island Bellbird
 Guadalupe Flicker (subsp.), a woodpecker
1907
 Huia
 Black Mamo
1908
 Alejandro Selkirk Firecrown (subsp. leyboldi), a hummingbird
1910
 New Zealand merganser
 Carolina Parakeet (subsp. ludoviciana)
 Choiseul Crested Pigeon
 Slender-billed grackle
1911
 Guadalupe Storm Petrel
1914
 Forest Spotted Owlet
 Passenger pigeon
1916
 Korean Crested Shelduck
1918
 Carolina Parakeet (subsp. carolinensis)
 Lānaʻi Hookbill, a honeycreeper
1920
 Delalande's Madagascar Coucal
 Laysan Millerbird (subsp.)
 Lord Howe Island Flycatcher
 Lord Howe Island Vinous-tinted Blackbird (subsp.)
1923
 Laysan 'Apapane (subsp.)
 Lord Howe Island White Eye
1924
 Iwo Jima Rail
 Lord Howe Island Fantail (subsp.)
 Pink-headed Duck
1925
 Lord Howe Island Starling (subsp.)
1927
 Paradise parrot
1928
 Spotted green pigeon
1929
 Bering cackling goose (subsp.)
1930
 Oʻahu ʻAkepa (subsp.), a honeycreeper
1931
 Lanai ʻōmaʻo (subsp.), a thrush
1932
 Glaucous macaw
 Heath Hen (subsp.)
1934
 Hawaiʻi ʻōʻō
1936
 Molokai ʻōmaʻo (subsp.), a thrush
1937
 Lana'i 'Alauahio
 ʻUla-ʻai-hawane
1940
 Hawaiʻi ʻAkialoa
 Oahu 'Akioloa (subsp.)
1941
 Arabian Ostrich (subsp.)
1944
 Laysan Rail
1945
 Wake Island Rail
1950
 Grand Caymen Oriole (subsp. bairdi)
 Imperial Woodpecker
 Madagascar Serpent Eagle
 New Caledonian White-throated Eared-nightjar
1952
 Niceforo's Pintail (subsp.)
1959
 Rennell Island Teal (subsp. remissa)
1963
 Kākāwahie, a honeycreeper
1964
 Korean Crested Shelduck
1965
 Fiji Bar-winged Rail
 Kauaʻi Nukupuʻu (subsp.)
 New Zealand Bush Wren (subsp.)
1969
 Kauai Akialoa (subsp.)
1970
 Molokai 'Alauahio (subsp. flammea)
1971
 St. Lucia Wren (subsp.)
1974
 Spix's macaw
1980
 Bachman's 
Warbler
 Eskimo Curlew
 Mariana Mallard
1985
 Alaotra Grebe
1987
 Kauai Oo
1988
 Maui 'Akepa (subsp.)
1990
 Borreo's Cinnamon Teal
 Hooded Seedeater
 'O'u
 O'ahu 'Alauahio
 Dusky Seaside Sparrow
 Atitlán grebe
1995
 Maui Nukupu'u
1998
 Kauai Nukupu'u

21st century

c. 2000
Siau scops owl
Hawaiian crow
Cape Verde kite
2004
Po'ouli
Slender billed curlew
Pernambuco pygmy owl

2007
South Island kōkako
Cryptic treehunter, an ovenbird
Cozumel thrasher

2011
Alagoas foliage-gleaner

See also 
List of extinct bird species since 1500
Lists of extinct animals
List of extinct animals of the Hawaiian Islands
List of extinct animals of Martinique and Guadeloupe
List of extinct animals of Réunion

References

 
Bird extinctions by year